The Hides gas field is a natural gas field located in the Hela Province of Papua New Guinea. It was discovered by BP in 1987 who relinquished their interest, and later developed by ExxonMobil. It began production in 1988 and produces natural gas and condensates. The total proven reserves of the Hides gas field are around 7.1 trillion cubic feet (203×109m³), and production is slated to be around 100 million cubic feet/day (2.9×106m³) in 2010.

References

Natural gas fields in Papua New Guinea
ExxonMobil oil and gas fields